A rotating wheel space station, also known as a von Braun wheel, is a concept for a hypothetical wheel-shaped space station. Originally proposed by Konstantin Tsiolkovsky in 1903, the idea was expanded by Herman Potočnik in 1929.

Specifications
This type of station rotates about its axis,  creating an environment of artificial gravity. Occupants of the station would experience centripetal acceleration, according to the following equation:

 

In theory, the station could be configured to simulate the gravitational acceleration of Earth (9.81 m/s2), allowing for human long stays in space without the drawbacks of microgravity.

History
Both scientists and science fiction writers have thought about the concept of a rotating wheel space station since the beginning of the 20th century. Konstantin Tsiolkovsky wrote about using rotation to create an artificial gravity in space in 1903. Herman Potočnik introduced a spinning wheel station with a 30-meter diameter in his Problem der Befahrung des Weltraums (The Problem of Space Travel). He even suggested it be placed in a geostationary orbit.

In the 1950s, Wernher von Braun and Willy Ley, writing in Colliers Magazine, updated the idea, in part as a way to stage spacecraft headed for Mars. They envisioned a rotating wheel with a diameter of 76 meters (250 feet). The 3-deck wheel would revolve at 3 RPM to provide artificial one-third gravity. It was envisaged as having a crew of 80.

In 1959, a NASA committee opined that such a space station was the next logical step after the Mercury program. The Stanford torus, proposed by NASA in 1975, is an enormous version of the same concept, that could harbor an entire city.

NASA has never attempted to build a rotating wheel space station, for several reasons. First, such a station would be very difficult to construct, given the limited lifting capability available to the United States and other spacefaring nations. Assembling such a station and pressurizing it would present formidable obstacles, which, although not beyond NASA's technical capability, would be beyond available budgets. Second, NASA considers the present space station, the International Space Station (ISS), to be valuable as a zero gravity laboratory, and its current microgravity environment was a conscious choice.

In the 2010s, NASA explored plans for a Nautilus X centrifuge demonstration project. If flown, this would add a centrifuge sleep quarters module to the ISS. This makes it possible to experiment with artificial gravity without destroying the usefulness of the ISS for zero g experiments. It could lead to deep space missions under full g in centrifuge sleeping quarters following the same approach.

Gallery

In fiction

Many fictional space stations and ships use a rotating design.

1936: In Alexander Belyaev's novel KETs Star a circular space station provides pseudo-gravity of about 0.1g by its rotation.

1958: The film Queen of Outer Space features a rotating space station that gets blown up.

1968: Arthur C. Clarke's novel 2001: A Space Odyssey was developed concurrently with Stanley Kubrick's film version of the same name. In it, the rotating space station Space Station V provides artificial gravity and features prominently on the book's first-edition cover. The Jupiter mission spacecraft, Discovery One, features a centrifuge for the crew living quarters that provides artificial gravity.

1968: In the six part Doctor Who TV serial The Wheel in Space the titular station is the main setting of the story.

1970:  The novel Ringworld describes a very large, habitable structure, centered on a star.

1984: The Peter Hyams directed film 2010 features a battleship-size, Russian built spacecraft (designed by futurist artist Syd Mead), the Leonov, which has a continuously rotating central section, providing an artificial gravity for the occupants.

1985: The novel Ender's Game features a multi-ringed station, called "Battle School," with varying levels of simulated gravity. As the characters ascend through the station towards the center, there is a noticeable decline in the feeling of gravity.

1994: The humans in the science fiction series Babylon 5 live in an O'Neill cylinder station use rotating sections to provide artificial gravity. Earth Alliance space stations such as the Babylon series (hence the name of the series), transfer stations such as the one at Io near the main Sol system jump gate, and EarthForce Omega-Class destroyer spaceships made extensive use of rotating sections to lengthen deployment times and increase mission flexibility as the effects of zero gravity are no longer a concern.

1999: The Japanese manga and anime Planetes has its main story set in "The Seven," the 7th wheel orbital station, and a 9th is under construction by 2075. In the Zenon trilogy (Zenon: Girl of the 21st Century, Zenon: The Zequel and Zenon: Z3), 13-year-old Zenon lives on a rotating space station owned by the fictional WyndComm from 2049 though 2054, but it is not designed in a way that would allow for artificial gravity through centripetal force.

2000: In the film Mission to Mars, Mars II, a NASA spacecraft hastily repurposed for a recovery mission of humanity's first mission to Mars in 2020, features a rotating crew habitat whose artificial gravitational rotation was shut down using the ship's attitude control thrusters to allow emergency repairs to the hull following a micrometeoroid shower.

2001: In the series HALO created by Bungie Games, a planetary sized ring is depicted 
that can harbor Earth-like fauna and environments by simulating gravity through its spinning.

2003: In the re-imagined series Battlestar Galactica. Ragnar Anchorage is a three ringed weapons storage station, and the civilian ship Zephyr is a luxury liner featuring a ringed midsection.

2007: The "Presidium" sector of the Citadel space station in the Mass Effect series of video games comprises a rotating toroidal section connected to a docking ring, with five large "wards" radiating out from the central ring like a flower's petals. In addition, Arcturus Station, the human seat of government on the galactic stage (not shown in the games, but described in detail) is also mentioned as being a rotating Stanford torus.

2010: In the OVA Mobile Suit Gundam Unicorn, the official residence for the prime minister of the Earth Federation "Laplace" was an example of Stanford torus.

2011: Most space stations in the Expanse series make use of artificial gravity by rotation, most notably Tycho Station. Even larger celestial objects like Ceres and Eros have been hollowed out and spun up to generate gravitational pull for their inhabitants.

2013: The Neill Blomkamp film Elysium has an enormous space station called Elysium (an open-roofed station  in diameter, somewhere between a much-larger open-roofed Bishop Ring and a smaller, fully enclosed Stanford Torus.) The station in the movie supports a city and habitat for the privileged upper classes of Earth.

2014: A vessel very similar in design to the NASA-designed Nautilus-X was used in Interstellar. The ship, known as the Endurance, was used as a staging station also capable of interplanetary flight.

2014: Space stations in the video game Elite: Dangerous (and its prequels) rotate to create artificial gravity.

2015: Thunderbird 5 in the ITV TV show Thunderbirds Are Go features a rotating gravity ring section on the space station which features a glass floor to observe the Earth below. The series is set in the year 2060.

2015: The NASA-designed Hermes in the film The Martian was capable of space travel to Mars.

2018: A planetarium movie Mars 1001 shows a fictional mission to Mars employing a rotating spacecraft. Fallout 76 includes a ruined space station that has a rotating wheel on it in a location called The Crater.

2022: The Mandalorian is shown on a rotating ring with artificial gravity in the Book of Boba Fett.

2022: The season 3 premiere of For All Mankind, an Apple TV+ original series, depicts a space hotel with a rotating wheel for gravity generation which becomes important to the storyline after the rotating mechanism malfunctions.

See also

Space habitat
Space colonization
Weightlessness
Stanford torus, a design for a  diameter space habitat capable of housing 10,000 to 140,000 permanent residents, proposed in 1975 by NASA.
Bishop Ring (habitat)
O'Neill cylinder, a  diameter space settlement design proposed in 1976 by Gerard K. O'Neill.
Ringworld
Man Will Conquer Space Soon!, a famous series of 1950s magazine articles detailing Wernher von Braun's plans for crewed spaceflight.
Mars Direct, proposal for a human mission to Mars. It contains a design to generate artificial gravity by tethering a "Habitat Unit" to a rocket stage and rotating them about a common axis.
Space stations and habitats in popular culture

References

Proposed space stations
Space station